Clivina bacillaria is a species of ground beetle in the subfamily Scaritinae. It was described by Henry Walter Bates in 1889.

References

bacillaria
Beetles described in 1889